David Lee Richardson II is an American lawyer who currently serves as Treasurer of Virginia, after being appointed by Governor Glenn Youngkin in June 2022. He was previously a partner at McGuireWoods.

References

Living people
State treasurers of Virginia
Virginia Independents
University of Virginia School of Law alumni
Year of birth missing (living people)